Dormoy is a French surname. Notable people with the surname include:

 Pierre Jacques Dormoy (1825–1892), French Protestant engineer and inventor
 Étienne Dormoy (1885–1959), French aeronautical engineer and aircraft designer
 Marx Dormoy (1888–1941), French socialist politician.
 Marcelle Dormoy (1895–1976), French fashion designer active 1910s to 1950

See also
 Dormoy Bathtub, a racing aeroplane invented by Etienne Dormoy in the 1920s
 Marx Dormoy (Paris Métro), a station of the Paris Métro named after the politician

French-language surnames